Dioptis onega is a moth of the family Notodontidae first described by Henry Walter Bates in 1862. It is found in Brazil.

It bears remarkable resemblance to its co-mimic Oleria onega.

References

Moths described in 1862
Notodontidae of South America